Kathrin Giese-Stoll is an East German sprint canoer who competed in the early to mid-1980s. She won five medals at the ICF Canoe Sprint World Championships with four golds (1981, (1982, 1983, 1985) and a silver (K-1 500 m: 1986).

References

East German female canoeists
Living people
Year of birth missing (living people)
ICF Canoe Sprint World Championships medalists in kayak